is a Japanese musical artist and voice actor. He is noted for having performed several songs for the anime adaptation of D.N.Angel.

Biography

Early life and music interest
Miyamoto started playing the piano at the age of four. Later, he enrolled to a vocal school around the same time he entered high school.

2002–2007
He made his singing debut with the single "Byakuya: True Light", the opening theme song for the anime D.N.Angel. He was soon signed up by JVC music as a solo artist and started to release his own music. His first mini-album, Anges (meaning "angels" in French) contains many of the songs that were used in D.N.Angel, namely "Michishirube" and live versions of "Byakuya: True Light", and "Caged Bird".

He was cast with the role of Shani Andras in Mobile Suit Gundam SEED. However, it appears he has not done much voice-acting so far apart from this role and one or two minor roles in a few other anime including D.N.Angel.

He has also started his own internet radio called Miyasoba, which runs fortnightly. He covers a variety of things for each episode such as reading out letters/greetings he has received by post or email; previews of his new songs or some piano pieces he is still working on, as well as talking about what is new with his current life and plans.

Miyamoto's CD album Piano n Piano was released in August 2007 and charted highly on the Japanese independent music charts.

2008–present
In 2008, Miyamoto signed to Tri-Arion and left Victor Entertainment. He changed his stage name to Shunn. His first single released under this new name is "Ihōjin/Sakura Sakukoro".

Miyamoto performs at live jazz, classical and other musical events across Japan (mostly at a concert hall called 恵比寿天窓 Switch – a popular place with many semi-professional musician, including Hoshino Michiru (AKB48)).

Discography

Studio albums 
2003: Anges
2005: For Someone Needs Love
2006: Talkin' Piano
2007: Piano'n Piano

Singles 
2003: "Byakuya (True Light)"
2004: "Saigo No Kiss"
2005: "Eien"
2008: "Ihōjin/Sakura Sakukoro"

Filmography
D.N.Angel (2003) – Miyamoto (cameo)
Mobile Suit Gundam SEED (2002) – Shani Andras

References

External links 
 
 Official website 
 Victor Entertainment website
 Official blog 
 Shunichi Miyamoto at GamePlaza-Haruka Voice Acting Database 
 Shunichi Miyamoto at Hitoshi Doi's Seiyuu Database

1986 births
21st-century Japanese male musicians
21st-century Japanese pianists
Japanese male pianists
Japanese male voice actors
Japanese pianists
Living people
Male actors from Tokyo
Musicians from Tokyo
University of Tsukuba alumni